Rex Rogers (24 August 1916 – 22 May 1996) was an Australian cricketer. He played in 56 first-class matches for Queensland between 1935 and 1949.

See also
 List of Queensland first-class cricketers

References

External links
 

1916 births
1996 deaths
Australian cricketers
Queensland cricketers
Sportspeople from Cairns
Cricketers from Queensland